Events of 2019 in Kenya.

Incumbents 
 President: Uhuru Kenyatta
 Deputy President: William Ruto
 Chief Justice: David Maraga

Events 

January 15: 2019 Nairobi hotel attack: A terrorist attack in Nairobi kills 21 people and injures 28 more.
September 30: Kenyan police are put on high alert after recovering intelligence suggesting that several operatives had been sent into the country by al-Shabaab, a Somali jihadist group affiliated with al-Qaeda.

References

 
Kenya